ABS-CBN Digital Media, commonly known as Digital Media Division, formerly known as ABS-CBN Interactive, is the digital media and internet division of ABS-CBN. It was formerly a separate company operating as a wholly owned subsidiary of ABS-CBN Corporation until 2013, when ABS-CBN Interactive, Inc. was merged to its parent. ABS-CBN Digital Media is responsible for overseeing all of ABS-CBN's internet and digital properties which include websites, mobile and web applications, social media accounts, and the distribution of ABS-CBN's contents (TV channels, audio channels, TV programs, films, music recordings, music videos, images, magazines, books, news, etc.) to digital and online space. ABS-CBN Digital Media has made many first in Philippine media, such as the first ever TV network website (ABS-CBN.com launched in 1995), the first ever Filipino news website (ABS-CBNnews.com launched in 1997), and the first Filipino video streaming website (ABS-CBN Now! launched in 2003; now known as IWantTFC). In 2017, the company was the largest in digital media platforms in the Philippines.

History
ABS-CBN Digital Media was originally part of ABS-CBN's IT department labeled as the Interactive Media Group (IMG). The group was formed and initiated by Victoria Ferro. After three years of business development and consistent production of new forms of digital media, the IMG was spun off to a separate subsidiary of the ABS-CBN Broadcasting Corporation. ABS-CBN Interactive, Inc. was formally incorporated in February 1999 with Victoria Ferro as Founder and Managing Director. By the time of incorporation, ABS-CBN Interactive had already pioneered many forms of digital media used today including live streaming and other mobile value added services. ABS-CBN Interactive was officially established to manage and grow ABS-CBN's digital presence and to monetize ABS-CBN's contents on cyberspace. Later that same year, Carlo Katigbak was appointed as the subsidiary's new Managing Director.

Together with its sister company's TV Production team, ABS-CBN Interactive's mobile business started out with the game show, Game KNB? (pronounced as "Game Ka Na Ba?", literally "Are You Game?"), where TV audiences can join through their mobile phones. The company continued to offer mobile value-added services with content sourced from ABS-CBN and its subsidiaries as well as other third-party content companies. A java mobile game was also developed based on Game KNB? game show.

In 2005, ABS-CBN Interactive, in partnership with ABS-CBN Global Ltd., launched the award-winning and the first Filipino online video streaming service TFC Now! This service allowed audiences around the world to watch ABS-CBN's programs anytime and anywhere via the internet.

ABS-CBN Interactive then formed a subsidiary, ABS-CBN Multimedia, Inc., to handle MMORPG business. ABS-CBN Multimedia acquired licenses of online video games from abroad and marketed it in the Philippines as Get Amped. Some of the games offered by Get Amped include Tantra Online created by Hanbitsoft of Korea, Ragnarok Online, War Rock, Cronous Pilipinas, and N-Age. This service was later discontinued due to financial difficulties and poor reception.

In 2011, ABS-CBN Interactive, together with Creative Programs and SKYcable, launched the Philippines' first user-generated interactive cable channel called CgeTV. This channel was later discontinued due to the poor reception.

In 2008, ABS-CBN Interactive signed a five million dollar deal with the global social networking site Multiply. The deal granted ABS-CBN Corporation to own as much as 5% of the global social networking site. This deal was proven to be fruitless as Multiply was later dissolved due to financial difficulties and the assets and property of the company redistributed.

In 2013, ABS-CBN Interactive, Inc. was merged to its parent ABS-CBN Corporation. ABS-CBN Interactive itself was later renamed as ABS-CBN Digital Media and is now overseen by Donald Patrick Lim as its Chief digital officer and Dennis Lim as the Head of Digital Media Services. Today, ABS-CBN Digital Media is responsible for overseeing all of ABS-CBN Corporation's websites and mobile applications. It is operated under the ABS-CBN Access segment of ABS-CBN Corporation headed by Antonio Ventosa.

ABS-CBN's official social media accounts on Facebook, Twitter, YouTube, and TikTok (mainly It's Showtime) are among the most influential in the Philippines. ABS-CBN Entertainment's YouTube channel is the first-ever Filipino content creator on YouTube to gained an aggregate views of 1 billion and the most viewed, most subscribed YouTube channel in Southeast Asia surpassing Thailand's WorkpointTV. Among the social media accounts managed by ABS-CBN Digital Media are ABS-CBN Entertainment (ABS-CBN's main account across social media, with over 21 million likes and 31 million followers on Facebook, 1.6 million followers on Twitter, and with over 2.6 million followers on Instagram, over 36.7 million subscribers and over 44.1 billion views on YouTube), ABS-CBN News (over 7.6 million followers on Twitter; 19.2 million likes on Facebook; over 13 million subscribers and 8.4 billion views on YouTube), ABS-CBN Starmusic (over 6.29 million subscribers and over 2.5 billion views on YouTube), ABS-CBN Star Cinema (over 4.03 million subscribers and over 1.2 billion views on YouTube), The Voice Kids Philippines (over 2.63 million subscribers and over 1.4 billion views on YouTube), The Voice of the Philippines (with over 3.7 million likes on Facebook; over 903 thousand subscribers and over 542 million views on YouTube), Myx (with over 7.5 million likes on Facebook; over 6.7 million followers on Twitter), and It's Showtime (with over 11.2 million likes on Facebook). ABS-CBN.com, the official and the centralized website of ABS-CBN Corporation for all of its subsidiaries is currently one of the top websites in the Philippines and is the top Filipino website in the country.

Digital properties

Defunct or inactive products and services
CgeTV - was a user generated interactive cable channel.
Get Amped/Amped Casual Games
 Cronous Pilipinas
 Ragnarok Online
 N-Age
 Tantra Online 
 War Rock
 select PopCap Games
Multiply (5%) - was a global social networking site.
PinoyCentral - the precursor of ABS-CBN Digital Media

References
 6. FEED-BIE

External links
 ABS-CBN.com
 ent.ABS-CBN.com
 news.ABS-CBNcom
 iWantTFC.com
 TFC.tv
 Push.com.ph
 OneMusic.ph

 
Software companies of the Philippines
Video game publishers
Assets owned by ABS-CBN Corporation
Mass media companies of the Philippines
Mass media companies established in 1999